Geoffrey George Farnfield (13 July 1897 – 22 March 1974) was an English cricketer.  Farnfield was a right-handed batsman.  He was born at West Ham, Essex.

Farnfield played 12 first-class matches for Essex in the 1921 County Championship, making his debut against Surrey, with his final game coming against Kent.  In his 12 first-class matches, he scored 252 runs at a batting average of 13.26, with a high score of 41.

He died at Leamington Spa, Warwickshire on 22 March 1974.

References

External links
Geoffrey Farnfield at Cricinfo
Geoffrey Farnfield at CricketArchive

1897 births
1974 deaths
People from West Ham
English cricketers
Essex cricketers